James Scott Peterson  (born July 30, 1941) is a retired Canadian politician. He was a Liberal member of the House of Commons of Canada from 1980 to 1984 and again from 1988 to 2007 who represented the northern Toronto riding of Willowdale. He served in the cabinet of Jean Chrétien as Secretary of State (International Financial Institutions) and the cabinet of Paul Martin as Minister of International Trade.

Personal background
Born in Ottawa, Ontario, he has a DCL from McGill University, a Master of Laws from Columbia University, and a Bachelor of Arts and a Bachelor of Laws from the University of Western Ontario. As well he has diplomas from Hague Academy of International Law in The Hague and La Sorbonne in Paris.

Jim Peterson is a son of Clarence and Laura Petersons. Clarence was an alderman of London and the provincial Liberal candidate in 1955 against future Premier John Robarts. All three sons of Clarence entered politics. Jim is the brother of former Ontario Premier David Peterson. Another brother, Tim Peterson, was elected to the Legislative Assembly of Ontario as a Liberal, but was defeated as a Progressive Conservative.

He is married to Heather (nee Johnston) Peterson, who served as a regional liaison officer in the Prime Minister's Office of Pierre Trudeau and as the national director of John Turner's successful 1984 leadership campaign. Peterson and his wife first came to public attention in 1974 when they helped ballet star Mikhail Baryshnikov defect from the Soviet Union during a performance of the Bolshoi Ballet in Toronto.

Politics
As a Member of Parliament in the House of Commons he represented the riding of  Willowdale in Toronto. Peterson ran as a candidate for the Liberal Party in the 1979 election but was defeated. He ran again in the 1980 election and won. He served as a backbencher under Pierre Trudeau and as a parliamentary secretary from 1981 to 1983. He supported John Turner's successful bid to succeed Trudeau in the 1984 Liberal leadership contest (for which his wife Heather served as campaign director) but lost his seat in the 1984 election. He was returned to Parliament as a result of the 1988 election and was re-elected in each subsequent election until his retirement in 2007.

Peterson was mentioned as a potential candidate during the 1990 Liberal leadership contest, but opted to support Paul Martin. When the Liberals returned to power under Jean Chrétien, Peterson served as the chair of the standing committee on Finance.

In 1997, Jean Chrétien appointed him to the Ministry as the Secretary of State (International Financial Institutions), but Peterson was sent back to the backbench in 2002. He returned to serve in the cabinet of Paul Martin, whom Peterson had long supported.

He was mentioned as a potential interim leader of the Liberal Party of Canada, following the resignation of Paul Martin; however, Bill Graham was named to the position. Peterson did not take a critic's portfolio in the Liberal Party's Shadow Cabinet formed by Graham or by Martin's permanent successor, Stéphane Dion. He and his brother David supported Michael Ignatieff for the Liberal Party leadership, where Jim Peterson serving as Ignatieff's Ontario campaign co-chair with former DFAIT cabinet colleague Aileen Carroll.

On March 8, 2007, Peterson announced that he would not be a candidate in the next federal election. Former Liberal Party of Canada leadership candidate Martha Hall Findlay was appointed as the Liberal candidate in his riding. On June 20, 2007, he announced his resignation from the House of Commons, which took effect July 12.

Post political life

On November 20, 2007, Peterson joined the international law firm of Fasken Martineau DuMoulin as counsel. The following month, Ontario's Minister of Economic Development and Trade Sandra Pupatello appointed Peterson as Ontario's chief negotiator in the Quebec/Ontario trade, investment and labour mobility negotiations. In 2017, Ontario's Natural Resources Minister Kathryn McGarry appointed Peterson as Ontario's chief negotiator in the ongoing softwood lumber dispute between Canada and the United States.

References

External links
 

1941 births
Columbia Law School alumni
Liberal Party of Canada MPs
Living people
McGill University Faculty of Law alumni
Members of the 26th Canadian Ministry
Members of the 27th Canadian Ministry
Members of the House of Commons of Canada from Ontario
Members of the King's Privy Council for Canada
Politicians from Ottawa
University of Paris alumni
University of Western Ontario alumni
Western Law School alumni
Canadian people of Norwegian descent